It's Kevin is a British television comedy show, created by and starring the actor and comedian Kevin Eldon. It was screened on BBC Two between March and April 2013.

Reception
Following the first episode, Serena Davies writing for The Telegraph said "what was perhaps surprising about this show was its off-beat charm" and gave the show 4 out of 5 stars. Keith Watson writing for The Metro gave it 3 out of 5 stars adding "any show featuring Bill Bailey in a pink jumpsuit can’t be all bad". Writing for The Mirror, Vikki Stone said "It's like thirty great YouTube clips back to back. It's fresh, original and anarchic".

Episodes
Every episode begins with Eldon singing the same theme tune but with different lyrics and to different visuals. Episode 6 is the only one set somewhere other than the normal studio, with a wild west theme. All the opening songs end with puppets of himself singing "Kevin, Kevin, Kevin" dressed in the same way as him and confetti pouring down from above. The studio is plain white normally furnished with a sofa that Eldon mainly presents the show from. The sketches in the show are normally linked together by Eldon talking directly to the audience. While Eldon is playing a version of himself, the other main role in the show is Bob the caretaker of the studio played by Paul Putner. A recurring theme is Bob reminiscing about past jobs he's had and normally laments about how he didn't enjoy them.

There are many recurring characters in the show created by Eldon himself that he has also previously used in his stand-up shows and in radio including the punk French singer Adal Dubois, Hitler with the voice of George Martin, the obnoxious poet Paul Hamilton and a fictional man from the north of England called Stanley Duthorpe. The end of every show featured a song sung by Eldon and on occasion with a guest star such as Bill Bailey in "Mobile Phone" and Peter Serafinowicz in "Brad". Other features of the show include a man falling down from the ceiling in the background, the yelling assistant Allison and the science segment called World Wide Wonders presented by Wendy Wilson played by Amelia Bullmore whom Kevin fails to flirt with. 

Episode 5 was delayed from 14 April due to BBC2 coverage of live golf.

Cast

The show has featured appearances from many recognisable names in British comedy most of whom he has collaborated before, including Bill Bailey, Patrick Baladi, Matt Berry, Adam Buxton, Rosie Cavaliero, Bridget Christie, Julia Davis, Simon Day, Justin Edwards, Harry Enfield, James Fleet, Nick Frost, Hattie Hayridge, Rufus Jones, Stewart Lee, Felicity Montagu, Simon Munnery, Paul Putner, Christopher Ryan, Peter Serafinowicz, Dan Renton Skinner, Johnny Vegas and Paul Whitehouse.

References

External links

2010s British comedy television series
2013 British television series debuts
BBC television sketch shows
English-language television shows
2013 British television series endings